The Belfast Central Railway was a railway company operating in Belfast, Northern Ireland. The company was incorporated by Act of Parliament in 1872 and acquired by the Great Northern Railway (Ireland) in 1885.

History
The Belfast Central Railway was built in 1875 to connect the three railway lines in Belfast (the Ulster Railway, the Belfast and County Down Railway (BCDR) and the Belfast and Northern Counties Railway (BNCR)). It branched off from the Ulster Railway (later the Great Northern Railway (Ireland) (GNRI) at Ulster Junction, and ran for 1½ miles to Queen's Bridge, with a branch from East Bridge Street Junction to the BCDR at Ballymacarrett Junction. A link to the BNCR was built later, via a tunnel under Queen's Bridge to the dock board railway at Donegall Quay Junction which, in turn, connected to the BNCR. This was used for goods only.

By 1885 the Belfast Central Railway had become unviable as a company due to increasing competition from the city's trams, and so it was acquired by the GNRI. On 30 November of that year passenger services were withdrawn and Ormeau station was closed. Queen's Bridge station was demolished in 1960 and the lines from East Bridge Street Junction to Donegall Quay Junction and Ballymacarrett Junction were closed in 1963 and 1965 respectively by the Ulster Transport Authority (UTA).

In the 1970s however, the Belfast Central line from Belfast Central Junction (formerly Ulster Junction) to Ballymacarrett Junction was relaid, and reopened along with a new Belfast Central railway station on 12 April 1976.

References

Railway companies established in 1872
Railway companies disestablished in 1885
Irish gauge railways
Great Northern Railway (Ireland)
Defunct railway companies of Ireland
Transport in Belfast
6 ft 2 in gauge railways in Ireland
1872 establishments in Ireland
1885 disestablishments in Ireland